Schröck is a borough (Ortsbezirk) of Marburg in Hesse.

Schröck has a population of 1,755 (2019) and was first mentioned around 1233 under the name of Scrikkede. The village has one primary school and various sporting places, such as a tennis hall and an outdoor sports arena.

References

External links 
 Official website 
 Information about Schröck at www.marburg.de 
 

Districts of Marburg
Marburg-Biedenkopf